Ray-traced ambient occlusion is a computer graphics technique and ambient occlusion global illumination algorithm using ray-tracing.

References 

Shading
Computer graphics
3D computer graphics
Global illumination algorithms